Sverdrup Township is a township in Griggs County, North Dakota, United States.

Demographics
Its population during the 2010 census was 92.

Location within Griggs County
Sverdrup Township is located in Township 145 Range 58 west of the Fifth principal meridian.

References

Townships in Griggs County, North Dakota